Andreas Zeyer (born 9 June 1968) is a German former professional footballer who played as a midfielder. He is the twin brother of Michael Zeyer.

Honours
 Bundesliga third place: 1995

References

1968 births
Living people
People from Neresheim
Sportspeople from Stuttgart (region)
German footballers
Footballers from Baden-Württemberg
Association football midfielders
Bundesliga players
SSV Ulm 1846 players
SC Freiburg players
Hamburger SV players
Karlsruher SC players
VfL Bochum players
German twins
Twin sportspeople
West German footballers